Meirion Williams (Dyffryn Ardudwy, 1901 – 4 October 1976) was a Welsh composer, best known for his songwriting. Williams studied with Walford Davies at the University of Aberystwyth and went on to study at the Royal Academy of Music in London, where he won prizes for his piano playing. He accompanied singer David Lloyd (tenor) on a series of recordings of Welsh songs for Decca in 1948. He is buried at  Parish Church near Dyffryn Ardudwy, where he was organist as a boy.

Recordings
 Bryn Terfel Yn Canu Caneuon Meirion Williams – Songs of Meirion Williams Bryn Terfel (baritone), Annette Bryn Parri (piano): (1993) Sain – SCD2013

References

1901 births
1976 deaths